The Laureate is a 2021 biographical romantic drama film written and directed by William Nunez. It stars Tom Hughes, Laura Haddock, and Dianna Agron. The film depicts the life of British war poet and novelist Robert Graves. The film premiered at the 2021 Mallorca Film Festival. The film won Film of the Festival at the 2021 Oxford International Film Awards as well as Best Feature, Best Director (William Nunez) and Best Actor (Tom Hughes).

Cast
Tom Hughes as Robert Graves
Laura Haddock as Nancy Nicholson
Dianna Agron as Laura Riding
Julian Glover as Alfred Graves
Patricia Hodge as Amy Graves
Indica Watson as Catherine Nicholson 
Christien Anholt as T. S. Eliot

Production
In February 2018, Kathy Bates was attached to the production with Tom Hughes, Dianna Agron and Laura Haddock already cast. Hayley Atwell and Dominic Cooper were also attached the production, but dropped out due to scheduling conflicts.

References

External links
 
 The Laureate on Metro International

2021 films
British biographical drama films
2020s English-language films
2020s British films